The Democratic Union of Turkish-Muslim Tatars of Romania (UDTTMR; , RMTTDB) is an ethnic minority political party in Romania representing the Tatar community.

History
The party was formed on 29 December 1989 as the Turkish Muslim Democratic Union of Romania (Uniunea Democrată Turcă Musulmană din România, UDTMR). On 12 April 1990 the new party split, with a breakaway faction forming the Ethnic Turkish Minority Union of Romania (UMETR), which later became the Democratic Turkish Union of Romania. The May 1990 general elections saw the party receive only 0.06% of the vote, but it won a single seat in the Chamber of Deputies under the electoral law that allows for political parties representing ethnic minority groups to be exempt from the electoral threshold. As a result of the split in April, the party adopted its present name on 23 July 1990.

The party has contested every election between 1990 and 2012, winning a single seat on each occasion.

Electoral history

Notable people
Negiat Sali

References

External links
Official website

Non-registered political parties in Romania
Political parties of minorities in Romania
Political parties established in 1989
1989 establishments in Romania
Tatars of Romania